Biljana Petrović (née Bojović; born 28 February 1961) is a retired Serbian high jumper. She set her personal best on 22 June 1990, jumping 2.00 metres at a meet in Saint-Denis, near Paris, France. She competed for Yugoslavia at the 1988 Summer Olympics in Seoul, South Korea, where she finished in 22nd place (1.80 m).

Achievements

References

 

1961 births
Living people
Serbian female high jumpers
Athletes (track and field) at the 1988 Summer Olympics
Olympic athletes of Yugoslavia
Sportspeople from Kraljevo
European Athletics Championships medalists
Yugoslav female high jumpers
Mediterranean Games silver medalists for Yugoslavia
Athletes (track and field) at the 1983 Mediterranean Games
Athletes (track and field) at the 1987 Mediterranean Games
Mediterranean Games medalists in athletics